Paz Cea de Conde was the first woman member of the provincial board of Camarines Sur, and the first woman governor of the Philippines. She first served as governor in 1937–38 by succeeding her brother, Governor Gerardo Fuentebella Cea.

Upon the sudden death of Governor Gallego, Pazita, as senior board member, became governor in 1941. Lastly, in 1945, upon the appointment of former Governor Mariano Garchitorena as cabinet member, Governor Paz Cea de Conde was appointed governor of Camarines Sur.

Paz Cea de Conde was born in Tigaon Camarines Sur into the well-to-do family of Cea and Fuentebella. Her mother, Dona Rufina Benites Fuentebella, was from Sagnay Camarines Sur, and Paz's uncle, Mariano Fuentebella, served as governor of Camarines Sur in 1914–1916. Governor Pazita is the daughter of Mayor Manuel Baduria Cea whose family had served the Municipality of Tigaon during the Spanish and American periods.
 
Her brothers Don Severo Fuentebella cea was a former mayor, congressman and delegate of Camarines Sur to the first Philippine 1934–35 constitutional convention. Another brother Judge Sulpicio Vicente Fuentebella Cea was a former congressman of Camarines Sur in 1916–1922,congressman of Albay in 1935–36, and first Governor of Catanduanes serving three provinces during his political lifetime.

Governor Pazita is the first cousin of Senator Jose Tria Fuentebella and Camarines Sur undefeated congressman Felix Abad Fuentebella, the father of Speaker of the Philippine House of Representatives Arnulfo P. Fuentebella. One of the successful nephew of Governor Pazita was the late senator Edmundo B. Cea, who was considered as brilliant Senator of his time who dreamt to become a vice president of the Republic but lost in the Nacionalista convention.

 
Governors of Camarines Sur
Members of the Camarines Sur Provincial Board
Women provincial governors of the Philippines
Paz Cea
Year of birth missing
Year of death missing